Pionersky is a rural locality (a settlement) and the administrative center of Mikhaylovskoye Rural Settlement, Novokhopyorsky District, Voronezh Oblast, Russia. The population was 135 as of 2010.

Geography 
Pionersky is located 44 km southwest of Novokhopyorsk (the district's administrative centre) by road. Polezhayevsky is the nearest rural locality.

References 

Populated places in Novokhopyorsky District